Sanford I. "Sandy" Weill (born March 16, 1933) is an American banker, financier and philanthropist. He is a former chief executive and chairman of Citigroup. He served in those positions from 1998 until October 1, 2003, and April 18, 2006, respectively.

Early life and education
Weill was born in the Bensonhurst section of Brooklyn, New York, to Polish Jewish immigrants, Etta Kalika and Max Weill. He attended P.S. 200 in Bensonhurst. He also attended Peekskill Military Academy in Peekskill, New York, then enrolled at Cornell University where he was active in the Air Force ROTC and the Alpha Epsilon Pi fraternity. Weill received a Bachelor of Arts degree in government from Cornell in 1955.

Weill's middle initial of "I" is not an abbreviation for anything. He has said:

Business career
Weill, shortly after graduating from Cornell University, got his first job on Wall Street in 1955 – as a runner for Bear Stearns. In 1956, he became a licensed broker at Bear Stearns. Rather than making phone calls or personal visits to solicit clients, Weill found he was far more comfortable sitting at his desk, poring through companies' financial statements and disclosures made to the U.S. Securities and Exchange Commission. For weeks his only client was his mother, Etta, until his later to be wife, Joan, persuaded an ex-boyfriend to open a brokerage account.

Building Shearson (1960–1981)
While working at Bear Stearns, Weill was a neighbor of Arthur L. Carter who was working at Lehman Brothers. Together with Roger Berlind and Peter Potoma, they formed Carter, Berlind, Potoma & Weill in May 1960. In 1962 the firm became Carter, Berlind & Weill after the New York Stock Exchange brought disciplinary proceedings against Potoma.

In 1968, with the departure of Arthur Carter, the firm was renamed Cogan, Berlind, Weill & Levitt (Marshall Cogan, Arthur Levitt), or CBWL jokingly referred to on Wall Street as "Corned Beef With Lettuce". Weill served as the firm's Chairman from 1965 to 1984, a period in which it completed over 15 acquisitions to become the country's second-largest securities brokerage firm. The company became CBWL-Hayden, Stone, Inc. in 1970; Hayden Stone, Inc. in 1972; Shearson Hayden Stone in 1974, when it merged with Shearson Hammill & Co.; and Shearson Loeb Rhoades in 1979, when it merged with Loeb, Rhoades, Hornblower & Co.

With capital totaling $250 million, Shearson Loeb Rhoades trailed only Merrill Lynch as the largest securities broker.

American Express (1981–1985)
In 1981, Weill sold Shearson Loeb Rhoades to American Express for about $915 million in stock. In 1982, he founded the National Academy Foundation with the Academy of Finance to educate high school students. Weill began serving as president of American Express Co. in 1983 and as chairman and CEO of American Express's insurance subsidiary, Fireman's Fund Insurance Company, in 1984. Weill was succeeded by his protégé, Peter A. Cohen, who became the youngest head of a Wall Street firm. While at American Express, Weill began grooming his newest protégé, Jamie Dimon, the future CEO of JPMorgan Chase.

Before Citigroup (1986–1998)
Weill resigned from American Express in August 1985 at age 52. After an attempt to become the CEO of BankAmerica Corp., he persuaded Minneapolis-based Control Data Corporation to spin off a troubled subsidiary, Commercial Credit, a consumer finance company. In 1986 Weill bought Commercial Credit for $7 million. After a period of layoffs and reorganization, the company completed a successful IPO.

In 1987, he acquired Gulf Insurance. The next year, he paid $1.5 billion for Primerica, the parent company of Smith Barney and the A. L. Williams insurance company. In 1989, he acquired Drexel Burnham Lambert's retail brokerage outlets. In 1992, he paid $722 million to buy a 27% share of Travelers Insurance, which had gotten into trouble because of bad real estate investments.

In 1993 he reacquired his old Shearson brokerage (now Shearson Lehman) from American Express for $1.2 billion. By the end of the year, he had completely taken over Travelers Corp in a $4 billion stock deal and officially began calling his corporation Travelers Group Inc. In 1996 he added to his holdings, at a cost of $4 billion, the property and casualty operations of Aetna Life & Casualty. In September 1997 Weill acquired Salomon Inc., the parent company of Salomon Brothers Inc. for over $9 billion in stock.

Citigroup (1998-2003)
In April 1998, Travelers Group announced an agreement to undertake the $76 billion merger between Travelers and Citicorp, and the merger was completed on October 8, 1998. The possibility remained that the merger would run into problems connected with federal law. Ever since the Glass–Steagall Act, banking and insurance businesses had been kept separate. Weill and John S. Reed bet that Congress would soon pass legislation overturning those regulations, which Weill, Reed and a number of businesspeople considered not in their interest.

To speed up the process, they recruited to the Board of Directors former President Gerald Ford (Republican) and former Treasury Secretary Robert Rubin (who served during the Democratic Clinton Administration) whom Weill was close to. With both Democrats and Republicans on their side, the law was taken down in less than two years. Many European countries, for instance, had already torn down the firewall between banking and insurance. During a two-to-five-year grace period allowed by law, Citigroup could conduct business in its merged form; should that period have elapsed without a change in the law, Citigroup would have had to spin off its insurance businesses. Weill's office holds a wood etching of him engraved with the words "The Shatterer of Glass–Steagall". Weill denies that the repeal of Glass–Steagall played a role in the recent financial crisis.

In 1998, Weill was the recipient of FinancialWorld Magazines CEO of the Year Award and received the same honor from ChiefExecutive Magazine in 2002.

In 2001, Weill became a Class A director of the Federal Reserve Bank of New York. Class A directors are those elected by Federal Reserve member banks. Also in 2001, Weill established several offshore enterprises, including one through which he owned his yacht.  These entities were identified in the Panama Papers.

In 2002, the company was hit by the wave of Wall Street managerial restructuring that followed the stock market downturn of 2002. In 2003, Weill sold 5.6 million shares of Citigroup back to the financial institution for nearly $264 million and relinquished the title of CEO to Charles O. Prince. He remained Chairman of Citigroup until 2006.

Advocate for bank break-up
On July 25, 2012, Weill apparently reversed course on the financial supermarket. "What we should probably do is go and split up investment banking from banking, have banks be deposit takers, have banks make commercial loans and real estate loans, have banks do something that's not going to risk the taxpayer dollars, that's not too big to fail," Weill said on CNBC. "If they want to hedge what they're doing with their investments, let them do it in a way that's going to be mark-to-market so they're never going to be hit."

Personal life
Weill married Joan Mosher on June 20, 1955. The couple lives in Sonoma, California. They have two adult children, Marc Weill (formerly married to news anchor E. D. Hill) and Jessica Weill Bibliowicz, and four grandchildren.

Philanthropy

Weill served as a Cornell Trustee for many years, and in 1998 he endowed Cornell's medical school, now known as the Weill Cornell Medical College. As chairman of the Board of Overseers of Weill Cornell Medical College and an emeritus member of the Board of Trustees of Cornell University, Weill orchestrated a $400 million donation to Cornell, of which he and his wife personally contributed $250 million. In June 2007, he endowed the Weill Institute for Cell and Molecular Biology at Cornell, housed in a new life science building named Weill Hall. On September 10, 2013, Joan and Sandy Weill and the Weill Family Foundation announced a $100 million gift to Weill Cornell. Weill is Chairman of the Board of Overseers of Weill Cornell Medical College and Weill Cornell Graduate School of Medical Sciences, having joined the board in 1982 and becoming chair in 1995. Weill Cornell established the first American medical school overseas in Doha, Qatar, in 2001. This was made possible through a special partnership between Weill Cornell and the Qatar Foundation for Education, Science and Community Development. Weill Cornell's inaugural class in Qatar graduated in 2008. Weill also serves on the Board of Governors of Sidra, a 380-bed speciality teaching hospital was scheduled to open in 2014 in Qatar.  Sidra is supported by a $9 billion endowment from the Qatar Foundation. In addition, he is a Trustee of New York-Presbyterian Hospital; a Trustee of Hospital for Special Surgery; and a member of the Executive Council of the University of California, San Francisco Medical Center.

In May 2003, he received the Baruch Medal for Business and Civic Leadership, presented by Baruch College for his work in public education and his accomplishments in business.

Long a proponent of education, Weill instituted a joint program with the New York City Board of Education in 1980 that created the Academy of Finance, which trains high school students for careers in financial services. He serves as Founder and Chairman of the NAF, which oversees more than 100,000 students in 617 career-themed academies of finance, hospitality and tourism, information technology, engineering, and health sciences, in 35 states, as well as the District of Columbia and the U.S. Virgin Islands. Ninety-nine percent of NAF's students graduate, with eighty-seven percent going on to post-secondary education – often as the first in their families to attend college. New York Governor Andrew Cuomo appointed Weill as a member of his New York Education Reform Commission. Weill has received honorary degrees from Howard University, Hofstra University, University of New Haven, The New School, and Sonoma State University.

He previously served as the Chairman of the Board of Carnegie Hall until 2016, and is an avid champion of classical music in the United States. Since 1986, one of the three performance halls in Carnegie Hall has been named after Weill and his wife, Joan and Sanford I. Weill Recital Hall. The 1997 recipient of the New York State Governor's Art Award, Weill has been Chairman of the Board of Trustees of Carnegie Hall since 1991. For Weill's 70th birthday, Carnegie Hall raised a record $60 million in one evening through a generous $30 million match by Weill and his wife for the Weill Music Institute, which established broad-reaching music education programs. Weill is also chairman of the Green Music Center Board of Advisors at Sonoma State University and a director of the Lang Lang International Music Foundation.

In 1997, Weill received the Golden Plate Award of the American Academy of Achievement. His Golden Plate was presented by Awards Council member General Colin Powell.

In September 2006, Joan and Sanford Weill Hall was dedicated at the University of Michigan. The building is home to the Gerald R. Ford School of Public Policy. Weill donated $5 million towards the construction of the building and an additional $3 million to endow the position of the dean of the school.

Joan and Sanford Weill have been co-chairs, of the annual "Louis Marshall Award Dinner", for most of the past decade (2000–2010).

In 2002, the Joan Weill Adirondack Library and Joan Weill Student Center were dedicated at Paul Smith's College.

The Weills are recipients of the 2009 Carnegie Medal of Philanthropy Award. Sanford I. Weill was the 2015 recipient of the Carnegie Hall Medal of Excellence.

In 2010, the Weills bought a 362-acre estate in Sonoma County, California. In March 2011, the Weills announced a $12 million gift to Sonoma State University, providing the funds to complete the Donald and Maureen Green Music Center concert hall for a fall 2012 opening. The facility, inspired by Seiji Ozawa Hall at Tanglewood, has been named the Joan and Sanford I. Weill Hall. "We love to be involved in the communities where we spend time," Sandy Weill commented to an interviewer.

In 2011, Rambam Medical Center in Haifa, Israel and the American Friends of the Rambam Medical Center announced that Joan and Weill and the Weill Family Foundation made a donation of $10 million. In addition, the money was intended to support the Israeli-Palestinian Friendship Center and enable the hospital to better serve patients from the Gaza Strip and the West Bank by making residential hostel facilities available to their families while providing advanced medical training to Palestinian residents, fellows, and nursing staff.

In 2012, Weill was elected a member of the American Academy of Arts and Sciences.

In September 2013, Weill and his wife wrote an op-ed for CNBC stating that philanthropy goes beyond just money. "For us, philanthropy is much more than just writing a check. It's donating your time, energy, experience, and intellect to the causes and organizations you are passionate about."

In 2015, Joan Weill offered an additional $20 million to Paul Smith's College, but only if it changed its name to Joan Weill-Paul Smith's College, a change that would have violated the terms of the devise of the school's real property, which required that the school be "forever known" as Paul Smith's College of Arts and Sciences. Paul Smith's applied to the New York Supreme Court for a release from the naming clause of the donor's will, arguing that its continued financial survival depended on receipt of Mrs. Weill's $20 million gift. Notwithstanding that argument, there was considerable opposition to the requested name change from alumni and others. The college was originally funded by the will of Paul Smith's son, Phelps Smith, who specified that the institution should be "forever known" by his father's name. In light of the potential donation, the college petitioned to be released from the will's conditions, but their appeal was denied by Judge Ellis.

In 2016 Sandy and Joan Weill announced a $185 million contribution to the University of California, San Francisco (UCSF) for a new neuroscience institute. At the time, the gift was the largest donation in the school's history. The Weill Institute for Neurosciences is housed in a $316 million facility at UCSF's Mission Bay campus. The Weills hope the institute will develop more effective treatments for such diseases as Alzheimer's, Parkinson's, multiple sclerosis, sleep disorders, autism, and other brain-related ailments. In 2019, the Weills pledged an additional $106 million for neuroscience research at UCSF, Berkeley, and the University of Washington.  The Weills are among Berkeley's top benefactors, with the couple contributing over $52 million in fiscal year 2020 alone; Weill Hall is named in their honor, and Sandy Weill is a member of the university's board of visitors.

References

External links

Booknotes interview with Monica Langley on Tearing Down the Walls: How Sandy Weill Fought His Way to the Top of the Financial World And Then Nearly Lost it All, May 11, 2003

World's Richest People 2005: 72. Sanford Weill, Forbes
Sandy Weill at Reference for Business
Past Winners of Harold W. McGraw, Jr. Prize in Education
 Website and biographical info for Marc Weill

Articles
HW Wilson: Today's Profile - 1999
The Banker: "Is Sandy losing focus?," September 2, 2002.
"Knowledge at Wharton".
Norris, Floyd. "Citigroup's Climb to Riches, One Merger at a Time with Sanford I. Weill", New York Times, July 17, 2003.
"Sandy Weill Sits Down With the WJ", Wharton Journal, September 22, 2003.
"Sandy's Story," Time, March 24, 2003.
 USA Today Q&A
Video
Wall Street Journal, November 9, 2005.

1933 births
American chief executives of financial services companies
American financiers
American people of Polish-Jewish descent
Carnegie Hall
Citigroup employees
Cornell University alumni
Directors of Citigroup
Fellows of the American Academy of Arts and Sciences
Giving Pledgers
21st-century philanthropists
Jewish American philanthropists
Living people
People from Brooklyn
Businesspeople from Greenwich, Connecticut
The Travelers Companies
American billionaires
American bank presidents
Carnegie Hall Medal of Excellence winners
People named in the Panama Papers
Philanthropists from New York (state)
Peekskill Military Academy alumni
21st-century American Jews